Great Yarmouth Power Station is combined cycle gas turbine power station on South Denes Road in Great Yarmouth in Norfolk, England, with a maximum output of 420 MW electricity, opened in 2001. It is built on the site of an oil-fired power station, built in 1958 and closed and demolished in the 1990s. A coal-fired power station was built in Great Yarmouth in 1894 and operated until 1961. The station is operated by RWE.

History
Great Yarmouth's first power station which used coal was built in 1894 and demolished in 1961 together with its iconic large chimney.

In 1923 the AC plant comprised 3 × 75 kW, 3 × 150 kW and 2 × 300 kW reciprocating engines and generators, and 1 × 600 kW and 2 × 1,500 kW turbo-alternators. The DC plant comprised 2 × 200 kW and 1 × 400 kW reciprocating engines and generators. The total generating capacity of the station was 4,175 kW. The total output of the boiler plant was 58,000 lb/hr (7.31 kg/s) of steam. Electricity was available as single phase AC, 83.5 Hz at 200 and 100V and DC at 500 V. In 1923 the station generated 3.776 GWh of electricity, some of this was used in the plant, the total amount sold was 5.559 GWh. The revenue from sales of current was £48,038, this gave a surplus of revenue over expenses of £20,776. By 1959 the plant comprised one Babcock & Wilcox 108,000 pounds per hour boiler delivering steam at 260 psi and 750 °F to one 7.5 MW and one 3.75 MW Brush-Ljunstrom turbo-alternators. Condenser water was drawn from the River Yare. The electricity output in the final years was:

Before demolition a second much larger plant, built on the South Denes, had opened in September 1958.

South Denes power station 
South Denes power station was sanctioned in Juy 1953 and was initially commissioned in 1957. It had an installed capacity of 252 MW and comprised 2 × 60 MW Metropolitan Vickers turbo-alternator and 2 × 60 MW Richardsons Westgarth turbo-alternators. In 1972 the 60 MW machine was up-rated to 64 MW. The four boilers were oil-fired and produced steam at a rate of 550,000 lb/hr (69.3 kg/s) at a pressure of 900 psi (62.1 bar) and 482 °C. Seawater was used for cooling. In 1961 the thermal efficiency of the station was 30.44 per cent. The output in GWh over the period 1961-82 was as follows. This plant produced power until it was first scheduled to close in 1984 before briefly being used again during the UK miners' strike (1984–1985) (see graph) after which it again remained unused until 1994 when demolition began. On 5 May 1997 the main building and its chimney were demolished via a controlled explosion watched by thousands of people from the roads on the other side of the River Yare. The  chimney was a landmark of Great Yarmouth, and had been the tallest structure in Norfolk.

The current gas power station plant was built on the site by Bechtel for Great Yarmouth Power Limited (a specially formed company owned by BP, Amoco and Arco) between 1998 and 2001. The project was projected to cost £185 million. The plant was operated by GE International, trading as IGE Energy Services (UK) Ltd and was then bought by RWE (trading as npower) in November 2005 for £155m.

Specification
It is a CCGT type power station that runs on natural gas supplied via a 12-inch diameter high pressure (69 bar) pipeline from the Bacton Gas Terminal 27 miles to the north-west. It has one 265MWe General Electric Frame 9 (9001FA+E) gas turbine with the exhaust gas heating a Doosan heat recovery steam generator, leading to a 150MWe Hitachi  steam turbine. At 420MW, it generates enough electricity for around 350,000 homes. It has a thermal efficiency of 57%. The terminal voltage of the plant is 19kV, which meets the distribution network of EDF Energy via a transformer at 132kV. The steam condenser uses about 9 tonnes of water a second drawn from the River Yare and discharged out to sea.

References

External links

 Other CCGTs in eastern England
 Acquisition of the power station by RWE at the Office of Fair Trading

Natural gas-fired power stations in England
Buildings and structures in Norfolk
Power stations in the East of England
Demolished power stations in the United Kingdom
Coal-fired power stations in England
RWE